Nationality words link to articles with information on the nation's poetry or literature (for instance, Irish or France).

Events

Works published
 Anonymous, Solomon and Marcolphus, publication year uncertain, England
 Giangiorgio Trissino, La poetica, Books 1–4 (Books 5–6 published in 1563), Italy

Births
Death years link to the corresponding "[year] in poetry" article:
 June 7 – Étienne Pasquier (died 1615), French poet and author
 Also:
 Johann Beltz (died 1584), German
 Olivier de Magny (died 1561), French poet
 Guy Du Faur, Seigneur de Pibrac (died 1584), French jurist and poet
 George Puttenham (died 1590), English writer and critic

Deaths
Birth years link to the corresponding "[year] in poetry" article:
 June 21 – John Skelton died (born c. 1460), English
 Also:
 Biernat of Lublin Polish: "Biernat z Lublina", died sometime after this year (born c. 1465), Polish
 Andrea Navagero (born 1483), Italian, Latin-language poet
 Baldassarre Castiglione (born 1477), Italian writer and poet who also wrote verses in Latin
 Krishnadevaraya (born 1471), Emperor of the Vijayanagara Empire and influential patron of poetry

See also

 Poetry
 16th century in poetry
 16th century in literature
 Dutch Renaissance and Golden Age literature
 French Renaissance literature
 Renaissance literature
 Spanish Renaissance literature

Notes

16th-century poetry
Poetry